The Texas Soaring Association is a gliding club located  south of Dallas Fort Worth airport in Midlothian, Texas.

Established in 1947, it was the site of the 2008 World Class Nationals Soaring Competition, held July 22–31, 2008.  The club operates from their own gliderport, FAA designation TA11, with a 4000 ft grass north–south runway with a narrow 3000 ft paved section, and a 1000 ft grass crosswind runway.

References
Texas Soaring Association website

Gliding in the United States